The name Greta has been used for four tropical cyclones in the Atlantic Ocean.

 Hurricane Greta (1956) - Category 2 hurricane, did not directly impact land.
 Tropical Storm Greta (1966) - no impact on land.
 Tropical Storm Greta (1970) - traversed the northern Yucatán Peninsula and later made landfall near Tampico, Mexico.
 Hurricane Greta (1978) - Category 4 Hurricane, made landfall near Dangriga, Belize, crossed Guatemala and southeastern Mexico as a tropical depression, then re-intensified in the Eastern Pacific and was renamed Olivia.

Atlantic hurricane set index articles